Diuris longifolia is a species of orchid which is endemic to the south-west of Western Australia.
It has a variety of common names including purple pansy orchid, donkey orchid, common donkey orchid and wallflower orchid. It was one of the first three terrestrial orchids to be named from Western Australia, along with Caladenia menziesii (now Leptoceras menziesii) and Caladenia flava.

Description
Diuris longifolia is a tuberous, perennial herb with channelled, linear leaves 10–20 cm long. The flowers are 2.5–4.5 cm long, coloured purple, yellow and brown and appear from September to November.

Taxonomy and naming
The species was first described by Robert Brown on page 316 of his Prodromus Florae Novae Hollandiae et Insulae Van Diemen published in 1810. The type specimen was collected by Archibald Menzies near Frenchmans Bay, the present site of the city of Albany around late September or early October 1791. Menzies was surgeon and naturalist on HMS Discovery on the Vancouver Expedition commanded by Captain George Vancouver.

The specific epithet (longifolia) is derived from the Latin words longus meaning "long"  and folium meaning "leaf".

Distribution and habitat
The species is endemic to the south-western corner of Western Australia, occurring in the Jarrah Forest, Swan Coastal Plain and Warren biogeographical regions. It grows in sand, lateritic loam, clay and granite in moist situations.

Conservation status
Diuris longifolia is not threatened at present.

References

longifolia
Endemic orchids of Australia
Orchids of Western Australia
Plants described in 1810
Endemic flora of Western Australia